is a Japanese competitive figure skater. She is the 2022 Olympic bronze medalist, the 2022 World champion, the 2018 Four Continents champion, a two-time NHK Trophy champion, the 2022 Skate America champion, and a three-time Japanese national champion. In addition to her individual bronze, she is also a 2022 Olympic team event bronze medalist. She is the first Japanese woman to win the World Championships since Mao Asada in 2014. Sakamoto also represented Japan at the 2018 Winter Olympics, finishing sixth.

On the junior level, she is the 2017 World Junior bronze medalist and the 2016-17 Junior Grand Prix Final bronze medalist.

Personal life

Kaori Sakamoto was born on 9 April 2000 in Kobe, Hyogo prefecture, in Japan. The decision for Sakamoto to become a figure skater was made as a family decision at an early age. In 2022 she was attending Kobe Gakuin University while continuing to compete in ice skating. Her hobbies are swimming and completing Jigsaw puzzles. Her coaches since childhood have included Sonoko Nakano, Mitsuko Graham, and Sei Kawahara.

Skating career

Early years 
Sakamoto began learning to skate in 2004 in Kobe. She won the gold medal at the 2012–13 Japan Novice Championships and placed 9th at the Japan Junior Championships in the same year. She was invited to skate in the gala at the 2013 World Team Trophy.

Junior career

2013–2014 season: International junior debut 
During the 2013–2014 season, Sakamoto debuted on the ISU Junior Grand Prix (JGP) circuit, placing sixth in Ostrava, Czech Republic. She finished eighth at the Japan Junior Championships.

2014–2015 season 
Sakamoto started her season by finishing seventh at her JGP event in Aichi, Japan. She won the Japanese national silver medal on the junior level before placing sixth on the senior level at the 2014–15 Japan Championships. Those results gave her a spot to compete at the 2015 World Junior Championships, where she placed fourth in the short program and 6th in the free skate to place sixth overall.

2015–2016 season 
Sakamoto began her season by winning the silver medal at her JGP event in Riga, Latvia, and finishing fourth at her JGP event in Toruń, Poland. Due to a stress fracture in her right shinbone, she stayed off the ice in October and resumed skating without jumps in November. At the Japanese Championships, she placed fifth competing in the junior event and thirteenth on the senior level. Sakamoto was selected to compete at the 2016 Winter Youth Olympics. She placed fifth in the short program and sixth in the free skate to finish sixth overall.

2016–2017 season: World Junior bronze 

Sakamoto received medals at both of her 2016–17 JGP assignments – silver in France and gold in Japan – and then won the Japanese junior title. In December, she took the bronze medal at the Junior Grand Prix Final in Marseille, France, and placed seventh, competing on the senior level at the Japan Championships. She was assigned to replace the injured Satoko Miyahara at the 2017 Asian Winter Games but withdrew due to the flu. She went on to win bronze at the 2017 World Junior Championships. She was invited to skate in the gala at the 2017 World Team Trophy as the junior world bronze medalist.

Senior career

2017–2018 season: Four Continents champion and Pyeongchang Olympics 
Sakamoto started her first full senior season at the 2017 Asian Figure Skating Trophy, placing first in both segments to take the gold. At the 2017 U.S Classic, she placed fifth in the short program and 4th in the free skate to place fourth overall, behind compatriot and gold medalist Marin Honda. Making her senior Grand Prix debut, she finished 5th at the 2017 Rostelecom Cup after placing fourth in the short program and fifth in the free skate. At the 2017 Skate America, she scored new personal best scores for both segments of the competition; she placed second in both the short program and free skate and won the silver medal overall behind teammate Satoko Miyahara.

Sakamoto won the short program at the 2017–18 Japan Figure Skating Championships. In the free skate, she placed fourth and won the silver medal, her first senior national medal. Following the competition, the Japan Skating Federation named Sakamoto to Japan's team to the 2018 Winter Olympics, alongside Satoko Miyahara. Sakamoto was named in Japan's team to the 2018 Four Continents Championships with Miyahara and training-mate Mai Mihara. She was also selected as the first alternate for the 2018 World Championships, behind Miyahara and Wakaba Higuchi.

At the 2018 Four Continents Championships, Sakamoto placed second in the short program with a new personal best score behind teammate Satoko Miyahara. Sakamoto won the free skate with another personal best score and the championship, leading a Japanese sweep of the podium.

Sakamoto competed in the ladies free skating portion of the Team Event at the 2018 Winter Olympics. She placed fifth individually and fifth overall within Team Japan. In the ladies' singles competition, Sakamoto skated a new personal best short program and was fifth going into the free skate. In the free skate, Sakamoto made minor mistakes but still was able to post the sixth-highest free skating score of the event and ended in sixth place overall.

Post-Olympics, Sakamoto competed at the 2018 Coupe du Printemps. In the short program, she placed first. In the free skate, she fell on the second jump of a planned double axel-triple toe loop-double toe loop combination and doubled a planned triple loop to place second in the segment. She ended the competition second overall behind compatriot Mai Mihara.

2018–2019 season: First national title 

Sakamoto began the season at the 2018 CS Lombardia Trophy, where a disastrous short program left her in ninth place going into the free skate.  She placed second in the free skate, rebounding to fourth place overall.  Subsequently, Sakamoto indicated that she felt she had not had enough practice time before the event.  Competing at the 2018 Skate America, she repeated as the silver medalist, again finishing behind compatriot Miyahara.  She pronounced herself "satisfied" with the results.  At her second event, the 2018 Grand Prix of Helsinki, Sakamoto fell twice in the short program, ending up in seventh place.  She came second in the free skate to place third overall and remarked:  "I gave it everything I had; that was the only chance I would have to make it to the podium today. I forgot about yesterday's program, and I just gave my best today."

At the 2018–19 Grand Prix Final, Sakamoto placed fourth in both segments, narrowly missing the podium after falling on the last part of her three-jump combination.  She expressed happiness at her score, even with the error.

Competing in the 2018 Japan Championships, Sakamoto placed second in the short program, slightly over a point behind Miyahara, the four-time defending champion.  In the free skate, she again placed second, behind Rika Kihira, but placed ahead of Kihira in the overall points total to win the gold medal. In doing so, she became the first skater to place ahead of Kihira in senior competition. She was named to the Japanese teams for the 2019 Four Continents Championships and the 2019 World Championships.

At Four Continents, Sakamoto placed second in the short program with a new personal best, 0.55 points behind Bradie Tennell.  In the free skate, she missed her three-jump combination when she popped the opening double Axel, and despite adding a double toe loop to her final jump, she lost several points as a result, and placed fourth in the free.  She missed the podium overall by 0.33 points.  She expressed frustration at the end, saying, "I was very nervous, and I missed some elements. It was such a disappointment, but I learned from this failure. I want to be stronger. At the World Championships, I want to put out the performance, both short and free, that is sharp and clean."

At the World Championships in Saitama, Sakamoto placed second in the short program, winning a silver small medal.  In the free skate, a popped triple flip caused her to fall to fifth place overall.  Sakamoto commented: "I still cannot figure out why I always cannot perform a perfect program, a performance without any mistakes."  Sakamoto concluded the season at the 2019 World Team Trophy, where she won the silver medal as part of Team Japan.

2019–2020 season: Struggles 
Sakamoto began the season at the 2019 CS Ondrej Nepela Memorial, where she won the silver medal, her first Challenger medal.

Beginning on the Grand Prix at 2019 Skate America, Sakamoto placed second in the short program and fourth in the free skate after popping two of her jumps and finished the event fourth overall. Her second Grand-Prix event was the 2019 Internationaux de France, where she placed sixth in the short program after falling on a double Axel and putting a foot down on her triple loop.  Sakamoto was fourth in the free skate, despite several under rotations, rising to fourth place overall.

On the 2019–20 Japanese Championships, Sakamoto was third in the short program despite underrotating the back half of her jump combination and was narrowly behind second-place Satoko Miyahara.  She struggled in the free skate, underrotating or downgrading five jumps, and falling once, placing seventh in that segment and dropping to sixth place overall.  Commenting on her disappointing results afterward, she attributed much of her difficulty this season to the absence of her friend and longtime training partner Mai Mihara, who was sidelined from training due to illness: "But this year I could not fight by myself. I’m old enough now that I should be able to rely on myself."

Despite her sixth-place finish at the national championships, Sakamoto was assigned to compete at the 2020 Four Continents Championships, where she was fourth in the short program despite turning out of the landing on her triple loop.  In the free skate, Sakamoto attempted a quad toe loop in competition for the first time but fell and had the jump deemed downgraded.  Making several other errors, she dropped to fifth place overall.  Speaking afterward, she said, "I couldn't fully trust myself. I'm glad I can use this experience and results as a learning experience for next season and future competitions."

2020–2021 season: Grand Prix gold 
Due to the COVID-19 pandemic, Sakamoto won both the Kinki Regional Championship and Western Sectionals to qualify for a spot at the national championships. Sakamoto began the international season at the 2020 NHK Trophy, which, to minimize international travel, was attended almost exclusively by Japanese skaters (the exception being You Young of South Korea).  She won the short program, introducing the triple Lutz into that segment for the first time in five years.  Skating a clean free skate, she won that segment by over twenty points, taking the gold medal by almost thirty.  This was her first Grand Prix gold medal.  Sakamoto attributed her improvement over the previous season in part to increased strength training facilitated by being off-ice during the pandemic.

At the 2020–21 Japan Championships, Sakamoto entered with the perceived momentum from her NHK Trophy win but faced the returning Rika Kihira, who had been scheduled to compete elsewhere on the Grand Prix that season. Sakamoto made an error in her short program, performing only a double toe loop instead of a planned triple as part of her jump combination, but ended up in second place, 7.48 points behind Kihira.  Skating cleanly in the free; she remained in second behind Kihira, who successfully performed a quadruple Salchow.

Sakamoto was assigned to the Japanese team for the 2021 World Championships in Stockholm. Sakamoto placed sixth in the short program and fifth in the free skate finishing in the sixth place overall. Her placement combined with Kihira's seventh place qualified three Japanese ladies' berths at the 2022 Winter Olympics in Beijing. Subsequently, she was announced as part of the Japanese team for the 2021 World Team Trophy.  She placed third in the short program and second in the free skate at the Trophy, while Team Japan won the bronze medal.

2021–2022 season: Beijing Olympics and World champion 
Sakamoto began the season at the Olympic test event, the 2021 CS Asian Open, where she won the silver medal. On the Grand Prix, she was once again assigned to Skate America, where she was fourth in the short program after doubling her planned triple flip jump. She was third in the free skate with no issues other than an edge call on her triple Lutz, but remained in fourth place overall, 1.04 points behind bronze medalist You Young. Sakamoto's second assignment was Japan's home event 2021 NHK Trophy, which she entered as the frontrunner due to injury-related withdrawals from both Alexandra Trusova and Daria Usacheva. She won both segments of the competition, her only flaws being edge calls on her triple Lutzes and an underrotated triple toe loop. She won her second consecutive gold at the NHK Trophy. Sakamoto's results qualified her to the Grand Prix Final, but it was subsequently cancelled due to restrictions prompted by the Omicron variant.

With Rika Kihira absent due to injury, Sakamoto entered the 2021–22 Japan Championships as the favourite for the national title. She skated cleanly to win both segments of the competition and her second gold medal, 12.28 points ahead of silver medalist Wakaba Higuchi. As a result of her victory, she was named to her second Japanese Olympic team.

Sakamoto began the 2022 Winter Olympics as the Japanese entry for the women's free skate segment of the Olympic team event. Skating cleanly, she placed second in the segment, albeit 30 points behind first place Kamila Valieva, taking nine points for Team Japan. Japan would win the bronze medal, making the team event podium for the first time and earning Sakamoto her first Olympic medal. In the women's event, Sakamoto skated a clean short program and earned a new personal best of 79.84, ranking third in the segment behind Valieva and Anna Shcherbakova. She said she was "quite satisfied" with the result and contrasted her prior Olympic experience at age 17 with "a lot of ups and downs in these four years" since. Despite placing third in the short program, it was widely assumed going into the free skate that Sakamoto would be passed by Alexandra Trusova, in fourth, whose technical content greatly exceeded hers. This occurred, despite a clean skate from Sakamoto that produced a new personal best score of 153.29. However,  frontrunner Valieva faltered in the free skate and dropped to fourth place overall, resulting in Sakamoto winning the bronze medal. She was the fourth Japanese women's singles skater to win a medal at the Olympics and the first in twelve years since Mao Asada in 2010. Speaking afterward, she thanked her coaches for helping her through "very challenging and struggling years."

At the 2022 World Championships Sakamoto entered the championships as the heavy favorite to take the gold medal. Skating cleanly, she won the short program with a new personal best score of 80.32, 5.32 points clear of second-place Loena Hendrickx of Belgium. She went on to win the free skate as well, setting new personal bests in that segment (155.77) and total score (236.09), the latter nearly twenty points clear of silver medalist Hendrickx. She was Japan's first women's singles skater to win the World Championships since 2014. Sakamoto observed afterward that "four years ago, I didn't compete at the Worlds after the Olympic Games because I felt burned out. It wasn't easy to get ready for this just a month after the Games, but I'm glad I did. It was all worth it."

2022–2023 season 
Sakamoto began the season at the 2022 CS Lombardia Trophy. She finished first in the short program but second in the free skate due to multiple errors, dropping to second place overall behind teammate Rinka Watanabe. At the 2022 Japan Open, she finished first in the women's free skate, helping Team Japan to the gold medal.

She opened the Grand Prix series at her fifth Skate America competition. Narrowly first in the short program after performing only a triple-double combination, she won the free skate decisively over American Isabeau Levito to take the gold medal, a result she said left her "filled with joy." Her Janet Jackson medley short program earned praise from Jackson herself. Sakamoto entered the NHK Trophy as the two-time and reigning champion and the favorite for the title. She placed second in the short program, behind South Korea's Kim Ye-lim, after the technical panel deemed one jump underrotated, another a quarter short of rotation, and her Lutz edge unclear. She finished first in the free skate, despite two jumps being called a quarter short of rotation and popping her usually reliable triple loop jump into a single, but remained in second place overall behind Kim. Both women subsequently qualified for the Grand Prix Final. Reflecting on her disappointing result, Sakamoto remarked, "coming into this season, I really wanted to do my best. Inside myself, there were an angel and a devil fighting each other. I want to overcome the devil. It tells me: 'you gave your best last year; this season, you can relax.'"

Sakamoto entered the Final as a contender for the title, winning the short program by 1.28 points over longtime friend and training partner Mai Mihara. She successfully landed a triple-triple combination in the short program for the first time in the season, commenting: "I understand that no matter how my short program goes, I have to do well at the free skate. So finishing my short program perfectly after a long time, although I'm relieved, tomorrow's here soon." The free skate saw most participants struggle, with Sakamoto making several critical jump errors, finishing sixth in the segment and dropping to fifth overall. She said afterward that she had struggled in her practice sessions and felt mentally strained, concluding: "In any case, I have no other choice but to accept this result."

At the 2022–23 Japan Championships, Sakamoto skated cleanly in the short program for a score of 77.79, taking the lead with 3.09 points over Mihara. Her free skate score, 155.26, was a new domestic personal best, earning her the national title for the second consecutive year, ahead of Mihara and bronze medalist Mao Shimada. Sakamoto, Mihara, and twelfth-place Rinka Watanabe were named to Japan's 2023 World Championship team.

Considered the favourite at the 2023 Winter World University Games in Lake Placid, Sakamoto won the short program over Mihara, but fell on her final triple loop jump in the free skate, finishing with the silver medal overall behind Mihara, the defending event champion. Appearing next at the International Challenge Cup at the end of February, Sakamoto won both segments of the competition to take the gold medal, in the process posting her first international free skate score of over 150 points for the season. Mihara and Mana Kawabe joined her in a Japanese sweep of the podium.

Programs

Competitive highlights 
 GP: Grand Prix; CS: Challenger Series; JGP: Junior Grand Prix

Detailed results

Senior level

Small medals for short and free programs awarded only at ISU Championships. At team events, medals awarded for team results only. ISU Personal bests in bold.

Junior level

Small medals for short program and free skating awarded only at ISU Championships.

References

External links 

 

2000 births
Japanese female single skaters
Living people
Sportspeople from Kobe
Figure skaters at the 2016 Winter Youth Olympics
Figure skaters at the 2018 Winter Olympics
Figure skaters at the 2022 Winter Olympics
Olympic bronze medalists for Japan
Medalists at the 2022 Winter Olympics
Olympic medalists in figure skating
Olympic figure skaters of Japan
World Junior Figure Skating Championships medalists
World Figure Skating Championships medalists
Four Continents Figure Skating Championships medalists
Competitors at the 2023 Winter World University Games
Medalists at the 2023 Winter World University Games
21st-century Japanese women
Universiade medalists in figure skating
Universiade silver medalists for Japan